This is a list of the six traditional counties of Northern Ireland by their highest point.

See also
List of Irish counties by highest point
List of counties of England and Wales in 1964 by highest point
List of ceremonial counties of England by highest point
List of mountains and hills of the United Kingdom
List of Scottish council areas by highest point
List of Scottish counties by highest point
List of Welsh principal areas by highest point
List of Northern Ireland districts by highest point

References

Counties
Highest point
Northern Ireland counties